Abejorral is a town and municipality in Antioquia Department, Colombia. Part of the subregion of Eastern Antioquia. It borders to the north with the municipalities of Montebello, La Ceja and La Unión, to the east with municipality of Sonsón, to the south with the department of Caldas and to the west with the municipalities of Santa Bárbara y Montebello.

It was founded in 1805 by José Antonio Villegas, although some believe it was in 1811. The latter was the year when the titles of the land were officially donated to the then existing residents.

Abejorral is one of the oldest municipalities in the Antioquia Subdivision and Colombia, It is known for its colonial times homes which are part of the Historical National Registry. Its topography is ideal for hiking  and cycling activities with beautiful panoramic views of river and valleys;  some of them  will provide beautiful conditions for wild camping specially along the Arama River or the Aures River. Abejorral has some touristic features highlighted by foreigners as unique like " La Casa en el Aire"  and the" Aures River Waterfall ". Another ideas about the options to visit and recommendations are part of this new blog "Orientese"

Sites of interest

Most of the town is a historical site; the architecture that has survived through the years gives Abejorral the aspect of a city "suspended" in the colonial era, which is the reason that a part of the municipality was declared National monument. Sites of interest include:

 Nuestra Señora del Carmen parish church.
 Nuestra Señora de los Dolores chapel.
 Hospital chapel.
 Municipal Cemetery.

 The Ancient Presbytery (Antigua Casa Cural).
 The founder's house (Casa del fundador).
 The Orange House (La Casa Naranjada).

Climate
Abejorral has a subtropical highland climate (Cfb) with cool and rainy weather year-round.

References

Municipalities of Antioquia Department